Seri Negeri complex is a state secretariat building complex located in Ayer Keroh, Malacca, Malaysia. It houses the offices of the chief minister (Block Bendahara), cabinet ministers, speaker of the state assembly (Block Laksamana), state assembly hall (Block Laksamana) and the official residence of the State Governor (Yang di-Pertua Negeri), which were previously scattered around Malacca City centre.

See also
 List of Yang di-Pertua Negeri of Malacca
 Malacca State Legislative Assembly
 Malacca State Executive Council

References

 

Ayer Keroh
State secretariat buildings in Malaysia
Buildings and structures in Malacca
Malacca State Legislative Assembly